La classe de 5e (French for Fifth Grade Class) is a Quebec television game show which premiered on February 5, 2009 on TVA. The show, an adaptation of the American game show Are You Smarter Than a 5th Grader?, is hosted by Québécois host and actor Charles Lafortune, who hosted L'école des fans and Le Cercle.

All winnings on this version are tax free.

The slogan used by the network is "Êtes-vous plus brillant qu'un élève de 5e?", the literal translation for "Are you smarter than a 5th grader?"

Game's prizes

The game is similar to La petite école, a weekly segment of the daily game show L'Union fait la force on Radio-Canada.

Originating from Montreal, La classe de 5e challenges Québécois contestants to prove that they are smarter than a fifth grader by answering a series of questions about a subject taught in a particular grade in a Quebec primary school, such as history, French, geography and mathematics. The set for the show is similar to the American version.

The class for the show is made up of five Montreal-area Grade 5 students chosen by the network for the show.

Gameplay

Other than the money structure, the show's game play is the same as the American series.

If at any point during the game the player drops out or flunks out, they must face the camera, state their name, and declare "Je ne suis pas plus brillant(e) qu'un élève de 5e." ("I am not smarter than a 5th grader.") However, if the contestant wins the jackpot, they will have the opportunity to declare to the camera "Je suis plus brillant(e) qu'un élève de 5e !" ("I am smarter than a fifth grader!")

References

 TVA press release about the Quebec adaptation of "5th Grader" 
 Article on Showbizz.net talking about the new TV show 
 Article on Cyberpresse

External links
 Official website 

Television shows filmed in Montreal
TVA (Canadian TV network) original programming
2009 Canadian television series debuts
2000s Canadian game shows
2010s Canadian game shows
2011 Canadian television series endings
Are You Smarter than a 5th Grader?